Region 6 is the name of a Statistics Canada census division, one of six in the Northwest Territories, Canada. It was introduced in the 2011 census, along with Regions 1, 2, 3, 4, and 5, resulting in the abolition of the former census divisions of Fort Smith Region and Inuvik Region (the latter not to be confused with the modern-day administrative region of the same name).  It includes the city of Yellowknife, and has the largest population by far of any of the six census divisions. Unlike in some other provinces, census divisions do not reflect the organization of local government in the Northwest Territories. These areas exist solely for the purposes of statistical analysis and presentation; they have no government of their own.

Its territorial outside boundary coincides roughly with the North Slave Region administrative region; however, Region 3 forms a sizeable enclave within it.

Main languages in the Region include English (80.7%), French (4.6%), Tagalog (2.7%) and Tlicho (1.9%).

Demographics 

Communities

City
Yellowknife
Settlements
Dettah

References

North Slave Region
Census divisions of the Canadian territories